Saras S.p.A. is an Italian energy multinational corporation with operations in petroleum refining, marketing, transportation and power generation headquartered in Milan and plants and registered office in Sarroch. Its main production plants are located in Sarroch, on the island of Sardinia, Italy.

History
The company was founded in 1962 by Angelo Moratti. In 1965 giant Sarroch refinery begun operations. In the mid 1990s Saras begun to operate
in the oil wholesale market with its subsidiaries in Spain (Saras Energia) and Italy (Arcola Petrolifera). In the early 2000s the company entered the power generation business, producing electricity from natural gas and, later, from wind farms.

Operations

The Sarroch refinery has the highest production capacity of any Mediterranean refinery and a refining capacity of about 15 million tons per year, the equivalent of 15% of the total capacity of Italian refineries. The group sells and distributes oil products directly, and through its subsidiaries, such as diesel, gasoline, diesel fuel for heating, liquefied petroleum gas (LPG), virgin naphtha and aviation fuel, mainly on the Italian and Spanish markets. In 2018 approximately 2.12 million tonnes of petroleum products were sold in Italy on the wholesale market, and a further 1.56 million tonnes were sold on the Spanish market through its subsidiary Saras Energia SAU.

From the early 2000s, the Saras Group operates an IGCC plant (Integrated Gasification Combined Cycle), which has an installed power of 575 MW (managed by the subsidiary Sarlux Srl). The feedstock used by the IGCC plant is the heavy products of the refinery, and the plant generates over 4 billion kWh of electricity per year, which corresponds to more than 45% of Sardinia's electricity requirement.

In addition, since 2005 Saras operates a large wind farm in Ulassai, Sardinia (managed by the subsidiary Sardeolica Srl), with an installed capacity of 96 MW.

The company is listed on the Borsa Italiana (Code ISIN: IT0000433307, Code: SRS, Segment: MTA).

Controversies and investigations 

In January 2007 Milan prosecutors launched an investigation on the listing of Saras for inflated prices. On 12 May 2011 the case was officially dismissed.

In January 2009 Oil, a documentary-film on the Sarroch refinery by Massimiliano Mazzotta, was released; the film investigates on the death of a worker on the job and the alleged widespread pollution caused by the refinery. The Moratti family tried, without success, to block the distribution of the film by presenting a lawsuit.

In May 2009 three workers died on the job at Sarroch refinery. On 7 March 2014 the Court of Appeals of Cagliari condemned Dario Scaffardi, manager of Saras, and Guido Grosso, ex manager, with a suspended sentence of 20 months (versus the previous sentence of 24 months), in addition to granting an award of damages to the plaintiffs. However, the company was judged non-liable.

Major shareholders

 Massimo Moratti S.a.p.A. (20.011%)
 Angel Capital Management S.p.A. (10.005%)
 Stella Holding S.p.A. (10.005%)
 Saras S.p.A.  (0.970%)
 Others (59.009%)

Subsidiaries

 Sarlux S.r.l. (100%)
 Saras Trading S.A. (100%)
 Deposito di Arcola S.r.l. (100%)
 Sarint S.A. (100%)

 Sartec S.p.A. (100%)
 Sargas S.r.l. (100%)
 Reasar S.A. (100%)
 Saras Energia SAU (100%)

 Terminal Logistica de Cartagena SLU (100%)
 Parchi Eolici Ulassai S.r.l. (100%)
 Alpha Eolica S.r.l. (100%)
 Sardeolica S.r.l. (100%)

See also 
 Oil, documentary film directed by Massimiliano Mazzotta. It explores the impact of oil development (implemented by the factory of Saras SpA) on the earth and the life of the local population.

References

External links
 Official website

Oil and gas companies of Italy
Electric power companies of Italy
Companies based in Sardinia
Companies listed on the Borsa Italiana
Rosneft